Skanky Skanky is the debut album by English electronic musician Toddla T. It features collaborations from artists including Matt Helders, Roots Manuva, Tinchy Stryder, and Benjamin Zephaniah. There are also more regular contributions from Serocee and Mr Versatile.

Critical reception
musicOMH wrote that the album "blends raw dancehall aggression with hip-hop sensibilities and an unshakeable sense of humour to create a sweaty, bombastic, and – above all – thoroughly enjoyable dancefloor-ready trip to the Steel City." Rolling Stone called it "a riotously funny barrage of electro hooks and dancehall riddims."

Track list

References

External links

2009 debut albums
Toddla T albums